A  is a style of kimono distinguishable by its long sleeves, which range in length from  for a , to  for an .  are the most formal style of kimono worn by young unmarried women in Japan.

The sleeves, like all women's kimono, are attached to the body of the kimono only at the shoulder, with the inner edge left open past the shoulder. , like other formal kimono, are mostly made from silk, and are decorated in bright colours to reflect the wearer's youth.  are often either rented or bought by parents for their daughters to wear on Coming of Age Day in the year they turn 20.

In previous decades, in particular before WWII, only young unmarried women wore , as marriage signified the end to a woman's single youth and the beginning of her transition into married life; higher rates of marriage at a younger age left few women unmarried past their mid-twenties, meaning that  were never seen on older unmarried women. Though  were worn to formal events, informal  – sometimes featuring shorter sleeves and more subdued decoration – did exist, and would have been worn to less formal events, or as a part of everyday life.

Formality guidelines for kimono have also relaxed, to the point that the divide between wearing  and other types of formal kimono is now one more of age, rather than marital status, with young women past their early twenties generally wearing shorter sleeved kimono instead. Both married and unmarried young women also have the choice to wear other types of formal kimono featuring shorter sleeves to formal events, such as the short sleeved , as well as wearing formal Western clothing rather than kimono.

In popular culture

History

The  originated in the mid-1500s as middle- and upper-class children's clothing, worn by both boys and girls; it was not worn by adults. Initially, the  had relatively short sleeves, and was used as everyday wear by those who could afford it. Over time, as the sleeves lengthened and became more exaggerated, the  became a style of kimono worn mostly to special occasions. According to one 17th century text, boys could wear  until their 18th year, or until they went through their coming-of-age ceremony, which usually occurred in late adolescence. Girls were supposed to cease wearing the  upon marriage, or upon reaching their 20th year.

Initially,  did not differ noticeably between the sexes, but fabric designs started to become more gendered in the 19th century. In the 20th century,  became restricted to women and girls only, as part of the increasing gender-specificity of children's clothing that developed in the wake of Western influence. As the  became increasingly associated with young adult women, the term was removed from the shorter-sleeved children's garment, which acquired the more generic term  ("open-sided").

Gallery

See also

Kimono

References

External links 
 

Japanese words and phrases
Japanese full-body garments
Robes and cloaks